ZC Excess Futsal Club was a Maltese futsal club based in Bidnija, last time known as Excess RP Bidnija after a merger with another local club RP Bidnija in 2011. 

It was one of the most successful Maltese futsal clubs having won three national leagues and one cup.

In 2010, Excess became the first Maltese side to win a competitive European futsal game when they beat Albania’s KF Tirana. They then drew with eventual group winners Ilves FC from a Finnish city Tampere, to finish third in the preliminary round tournament in Cospicua.

Achievements

Maltese First Futsal Division: 2009-10, 2010-11, 2011-12

Maltese Futsal Cup: 2011-12

References

Society of Malta